Picacho Peak Wilderness is a U.S. wilderness area located on nearly  of desert land in Imperial County, California, just west of the Arizona state line.  The wilderness area is managed by the Bureau of Land Management.

References

External links

Geography of California
Protected areas of Imperial County, California